Artur Gusmanovich Gilyazetdinov (born 10 March 1995) is a Russian football player. He plays for FC Volgar Astrakhan.

Club career
He made his debut in the Russian Professional Football League for FC Anzhi-Yunior Zelenodolsk on 19 July 2017 in a game against FC Nosta Novotroitsk and scored twice on his debut.

He made his Russian Football National League debut for FC Neftekhimik Nizhnekamsk on 7 July 2019 in a game against FC Mordovia Saransk.

References

External links
 
 Profile by Russian Professional Football League

1995 births
Footballers from Kazan
Living people
Russian footballers
Association football forwards
FC Neftekhimik Nizhnekamsk players
FC Tyumen players
FC Volgar Astrakhan players
Russian First League players
Russian Second League players